Howard McGhee (March 6, 1918 – July 17, 1987) was one of the first American bebop jazz trumpeters, with Dizzy Gillespie, Fats Navarro and Idrees Sulieman. He was known for his fast fingering and high notes. He had an influence on younger bebop trumpeters such as Fats Navarro.

Biography
Howard McGhee was born in Tulsa, Oklahoma, United States, and raised in Detroit, Michigan. 

During his career, he played in bands led by Lionel Hampton, Andy Kirk, Count Basie and Charlie Barnet. He was in a club listening to the radio when he first heard Charlie Parker and was one of the earliest adopters of the new style, a fact that was disapproved by older musicians like Kid Ory.

In 1946–1947, some record sessions for the new label Dial were organized in Hollywood, with Charlie Parker and McGhee. The first was held on July 29, 1946. The musicians were Charlie Parker, Howard McGhee, Jimmy Bunn, Bob Kesterson, and Roy Porter. With Parker's health near to collapse, he played "Max is Making Wax", "Lover Man", and "The Gypsy".

McGhee continued to work as a sideman with Parker. He played on titles such as "Relaxin' at Camarillo", "Cheers", "Carvin the Bird" and "Stupendous". Around this time, McGhee was a leading musician in the Los Angeles bebop scene, participating in many concerts, recording, and even managing a night club for a period. His stay in California ended because of racial prejudice, particularly vicious towards McGhee as half of a mixed-race couple.

Drug problems sidelined McGhee for much of the 1950s, but he resurfaced in the 1960s, appearing in many George Wein productions. His career sputtered again in the mid-1960s and he did not record again until 1976. He led one of three big jazz bands trying to succeed in New York in the late 1960s. While the band did not survive, a recording was released in the mid-1970s.

He taught music through the 1970s, both in classrooms and at his apartment in midtown Manhattan and instructed musicians like Charlie Rouse in music theory. He was as much an accomplished composer-arranger as he was a performer.

McGhee died on July 17, 1987, at the age of 69, a memorial service was held for him on July 24, 1987.

Discography

As leader/co-leader
 1946–47 Trumpet at Tempo (Dial [rel. 1996])
 1948 Howard McGhee and Milt Jackson (Savoy)
 1950 Howard McGhee, Vol. 1 (Blue Note) with Fats Navarro
 1951 Night Music (Dial)
 1952 Jazz South Pacific (Regent) with J.J. Johnson, Oscar Pettiford [AKA Jazz Goes to the Battlefront]
 1953 Howard McGhee, Vol. 2 (Blue Note) with Gigi Gryce
 1955 The Return of Howard McGhee (Bethlehem) [AKA That Bop Thing]
 1956 Life Is Just a Bowl of Cherries (Bethlehem)
 1960 Dusty Blue (Bethlehem)
 1960 Music from the Connection (Felsted)
 1961 Together Again!!!! (Contemporary) with Teddy Edwards
 1961 Maggie's Back in Town!! (Contemporary)
 1961 The Sharp Edge (Fontana) [AKA Shades of Blue]
 1962 Nobody Knows You When You're Down and Out (United Artists)
 1963 House Warmin'! (Argo) originally issued in 1962 on Winley Records as Nothin' But Soul under Gene Ammons' name.
 1976 Here Comes Freddy (Sonet) with Illinois Jacquet
 1976 Just Be There (SteepleChase) with Horace Parlan, Kenny Clarke
 1977 Cookin' Time, Howard McGhee Orchestra (Zim Records)
 1978 Live at Emerson's, Howard McGhee Sextet (Zim Records)
 1978 Jazz Brothers (Jazzcraft) with Charlie Rouse
 1978 Home Run (Jazzcraft) with Benny Bailey
 1979 Young at Heart (Storyville) with Teddy Edwards
 1979 Wise in Time (Storyville) with Teddy Edwards

As sideman
With Lorez Alexandria
Deep Roots (Argo, 1962)

With Georgie Auld
Rainbow Mist (Delmark, 1944 [1992]) compilation of Apollo recordings

With Billy Eckstine
Maggie: The Savoy Sessions (Savoy, 1947 [1995]) includes the infamous Eckstine/McGhee four song session, originally recorded in Chicago for Vitacoustic Records; personnel: Howard McGhee (tp), Billy Eckstine (vtb), Kenny Mann (ts), Hank Jones (p), Ray Brown (b), J.C. Heard (d), Marcel Daniels (v).

With Johnny Hartman
 Songs from the Heart (Bethlehem, 1955)
 All of Me: The Debonair Mr. Hartman (Bethlehem, 1956)

With Coleman Hawkins
 Hollywood Stampede (Capitol, 1945 [1972])
 Disorder at the Border (Spotlite, 1952 [1973])

With Chubby Jackson
 Chubby Jackson All Star Big Band (1950)
 Chubby Jackson Sextet and Big Band (Prestige, 1947–1950 [1969])

With James Moody
 Cookin' the Blues [live] (Argo, 1961 [1964])

With André Previn
 André Previn All-Stars (1946)
 Previn at Sunset (Polydor, 1972)

With Mel Tormé
 George Gershwin's Porgy and Bess (Bethlehem, 1956) with Frances Faye
 At the Crescendo (Bethlehem, 1957)
 Songs for Any Taste (Bethlehem, 1957)

With others
 1954 Billie Holiday at Jazz at the Philharmonic, Billie Holiday (Clef, rec. 1945–1946)
 1956 Way Out Wardell, Wardell Gray (Modern)
 1960 The Music from "The Connection", Freddie Redd (Blue Note)
 1962 Johnny Hodges with Billy Strayhorn and the Orchestra, Johnny Hodges (Verve)
 1962 Good Old Zoot, Zoot Sims (New Jazz)
 1963 At Newport '63, Joe Williams (RCA Victor)
 1967 Tribute To Charlie Parker (From The Newport Jazz Festival) (RCA Victor, rec. 1964)
 1968 Boppin' & Burnin' , Don Patterson (Prestige)
 1969 Early Quintets, Phil Woods (Prestige, rec. 1959)
 1976 Red Top: The Savoy Sessions (1947–1953), Gene Ammons (Savoy)
 1976 The Jazz Singer, Eddie Jefferson (Inner City, rec. 1959–1961)
 1989 Autumn in New York, Sonny Stitt (Black Lion, rec. 1967)
 1991 California Boppin' 1947, Sonny Criss (Fresh Sound)
 1993 The Chronological...1940–1942, Andy Kirk & His Clouds of Joy (Classics)
 1995 Dodo Marmarosa On Dial: The Complete Sessions (1946–1947), Dodo Marmarosa (Spotlite)
 1996 The Chronological...1944–1945, Wynonie Harris (Classics)
 1996 The Chronological...1945, Slim Gaillard (Classics)

References

Further reading

External links
[ AllMusic Discography]

 

1918 births
1987 deaths
American jazz trumpeters
American male trumpeters
Bebop trumpeters
Cass Technical High School alumni
Hard bop trumpeters
Jazz musicians from Michigan
Blue Note Records artists
Savoy Records artists
20th-century American musicians
20th-century trumpeters
20th-century American male musicians
American male jazz musicians
Bethlehem Records artists
Contemporary Records artists
Argo Records artists